Blackfellas is a 1993 Australian drama film directed by James Ricketson and starring John Moore, David Ngoombujarra, Jack Charles, John Hargreaves and Ernie Dingo. It is an adaptation of Archie Weller's 1981 novel The Day of the Dog. The film won two AFI Awards and had its premiere at the Valhalla Cinema in Melbourne on 26 August 1993.

Plot
In Perth, Western Australia, Doug Dooligan (John Moore), a young Nyoongar man, is released from prison, where he was incarcerated for assault. Outside, he is picked up by his charismatic childhood friend Floyd "Pretty Boy" Davies (David Ngoombujarra), who was partially responsible for Doug's incarceration, and taken to a remote Aboriginal community in Western Australia. He becomes attracted to a local girl Polly (Jaylene Riley) and, upon learning that Floyd is still involved in criminal activities, decides to leave and visit his mother.

Determined to stay out of trouble, Doug buys back his father's old property, Yetticup, which has traditional roots. Polly joins him at Yetticup and not soon afterward, Doug's father reappears after he had escaped from prison. Doug narrowly escapes the police when his father is apprehended, and the latter dies in prison. Distraught, Doug meets Floyd, and the two become friends again. When Doug tries to stop Floyd from committing a crime, Floyd sacrifices his own life so that Doug can escape and avoid arrest.

Cast
 John Moore as Doug Dooligan
 David Ngoombujarra as Floyd "Pretty Boy" Davies
 Jaylene Riley as Polly
 Lisa Kinchela as Valerie
 John Hargreaves as Detective Maxwell
 Ernie Dingo as Percy
 Julie Hudspeth as Mrs. Dooligan
 Jack Charles as Carey
 Michael Watson as Hughie
 Kelton Pell as Willice
Vivienne Garrett as youth worker

Production
James Ricketson became interested in the story in the early 1980s when he was directing an episode of Women of the Sun.

Reception
According to Ozmovies:
Proving once again that reviews can’t be banked, the film opened to generally positive reviews amongst mainstream newspaper reviewers but this didn't help at the box office.

Awards

See also
Cinema of Australia

References

External links
 
 Blackfellas at Ozmovies

1993 films
1993 drama films
Australian drama films
Films based on Australian novels
Films set in Western Australia
Films about Aboriginal Australians
1990s English-language films